is a Japanese footballer who plays for Kataller Toyama.

Club statistics
Updated to 23 February 2018.

References

External links

Profile at Thespakusatsu Gunma

1989 births
Living people
Association football people from Toyama Prefecture
Japanese footballers
J2 League players
J3 League players
Japan Football League players
Montedio Yamagata players
Tochigi City FC players
FC Ryukyu players
AC Nagano Parceiro players
Thespakusatsu Gunma players
Kataller Toyama players
Association football forwards